An early music ensemble is a musical ensemble that specializes in performing early music of the European classical tradition from the Baroque era and earlier – broadly, music produced before about 1750. Most, but not all, of these groups are advocates of historically informed performance, and attempt to re-create the music as it might have sounded at the time it was written, using period instruments and modifying playing techniques according to the most recent scholarly research into music of the time.

Names in parentheses below indicate current directors, unless otherwise indicated.

List of ensembles

Australia
 Australian Brandenburg Orchestra (Paul Dyer): baroque orchestra
 Ensemble Gombert, Melbourne

Austria
 Ars Antiqua Austria
 Cinquecento: vocal ensemble
 Clemencic Consort (René Clemencic): medieval to baroque
 Concentus Musicus Wien (Nikolaus Harnoncourt), Vienna: baroque orchestra
 Ensemble Eduard Melkus (Capella Academica Wien), Vienna: defunct
 Fiori musicali, Vienna: baroque chamber group
 Quadriga Consort: emphasis on early British traditional and popular music
 Quatuor Mosaïques (founded in 1985 by members of Concentus Musicus Wien), Vienna

Belgium
 Capilla Flamenca (Dirk Snellings): Renaissance choral
 Les Agrémens
 Collegium Vocale Gent (Philippe Herreweghe): Renaissance and baroque choir
 Currende (Erik Van Nevel): Renaissance choir
 Ensemble Clematis, Leonardo García-Alarcón: baroque
 Huelgas Ensemble (Paul Van Nevel): Renaissance choir
 Les Muffatti, Brussels: Baroque orchestra
 La Petite Bande (Sigiswald Kuijken): baroque orchestra and chamber ensemble
 Ricercar Consort: baroque cantatas
 Vox Luminis: 16th- to 18th-century Italian, German, and English vocal music

Canada
 Académie Baroque de Montréal (Suzie LeBlanc)
 Ensemble Claude-Gervaise, Montréal:
 Arion Orchestre Baroque, Montréal:
 Studio de musique ancienne de Montréal: mostly music of the Renaissance and early baroque
 Tafelmusik, Toronto: baroque orchestra and chamber choir
 Theatre of Early Music (Daniel Taylor), Toronto: chamber choir
 Ensemble Caprice (Matthias Maute), Montréal
 Opera Atelier, Toronto: baroque opera company
 Victoria Baroque (Victoria, B.C.)
 Les Violons du Roy (Jonathan Cohen), Québec City

Colombia
 Musica Ficta (Carlos Serrano): Latin American baroque

Czechia
 Collegium 1704 (Václav Luks): early music ensemble
 Collegium 419: early music vocal ensemble
 Collegium Marianum (Jana Semerádová): early music ensemble
 Musica Florea (Marek Štryncl): early music ensemble
 Schola Gregoriana Pragensis: a cappella male choir whose core repertoire is Gregorian chant, Bohemian plainchant, and early polyphony
 Czech Ensemble Baroque (Roman Válek, Tereza Válková): early music ensemble
 Ensemble Inegal - Adam Viktora

Denmark
 Ars Nova Copenhagen (Paul Hillier): Renaissance to contemporary
 Concerto Copenhagen (Lars Ulrik Mortensen): baroque orchestra
 Musica Ficta (Bo Holten): Renaissance and contemporary choral

Estonia
 Hortus Musicus (Andres Mustonen): medieval and Renaissance and baroque and contemporary music
 Rondellus: medieval and Renaissance and contemporary music

Finland
 Kuninkaantien muusikot – Musicians of the King's Road: baroque orchestra and choir
 Oliphant: medieval music

France
 L'Arpeggiata (Christina Pluhar): early baroque
 Les Arts Florissants (William Christie): baroque orchestra
 Boulanger Ensemble (Nadia Boulanger): historic revival of Monteverdi
 Capriccio Stravagante (Skip Sempé): baroque chamber music
 Les Siècles (François-Xavier Roth): symphony orchestra
 La Chapelle Rhénane (Benoît Haller): baroque orchestra
 La Chapelle Royale (Philippe Herreweghe): baroque orchestra
 Chœur de Chambre Accentus (Laurence Equilbey): Renaissance to contemporary choir
 Le Concert d'Astrée (Emmanuelle Haïm): baroque orchestra
 Le Concert Spirituel (Hervé Niquet): baroque orchestra
 Concerto Vocale (René Jacobs): baroque vocal
 Diabolus in Musica, Paris: medieval choral
 Ensemble 415 (Chiara Banchini): baroque chamber orchestra
 Ensemble baroque de Nice (Gilbert Bezzina): baroque opera
 Ensemble Clément Janequin (Dominique Visse): Renaissance chansons
 Ensemble Matheus (Jean-Christophe Spinosi): baroque orchestra
 Ensemble Organum (Marcel Pérès): Gregorian chant
 La Grande Écurie et la Chambre du Roy (Jean-Claude Malgoire)
 Les Musiciens du Louvre (Marc Minkowski), Grenoble: baroque orchestra
 Orchestre Les Passions
 Le Poème Harmonique (Vincent Dumestre): Renaissance-baroque chamber group
 Les Talens Lyriques (Christophe Rousset): baroque opera and orchestra

Germany
 Akademie für Alte Musik Berlin: baroque orchestra
 Pera Ensemble: baroque orchestra, Alla Turca
 Cantus Cölln (Konrad Junghänel): Renaissance and baroque vocal
 La Capella Ducale Musica Fiata (Roland Wilson)
 Cologne Chamber Orchestra (Helmut Müller-Brühl): baroque orchestra
 Concerto Köln: baroque orchestra; concert master: Evgeny Sviridov, guest conductors inc. Evelino Pidò, Daniel Harding
 Ensemble amarcord, Leipzig, vocal ensemble, medieval, Renaissance, contemporary
 Ensemble Santenay, Trossingen, Germany: Renaissance choral
Ensemble Schirokko Hamburg: baroque orchestra
 Estampie: medieval
 Freiburger Barockorchester (Gottfried von der Goltz): baroque orchestra
 G. A. P. Ensemble, instrumental trio
 Hamburger Ratsmusik: baroque chamber orchestra
 il Gusto Barocco: baroque orchestra
 Johann Rosenmüller Ensemble (Arno Paduch): Renaissance baroque choir and orchestra
 Lautten Compagney (Wolfgang Katschner): early music ensemble
 Münchener Bach-Orchester (founder Karl Richter)
 Musica Antiqua Köln (formerly Reinhard Goebel): baroque chamber music, now disbanded
 Musica Fiata (Roland Wilson): baroque wind orchestra
 Oni Wytars (Marco Ambrosini): medieval music
 L'Orfeo Barockorchester (Michi Gaigg): baroque orchestra
 Pantagruel: Renaissance music trio
 Rheinische Kantorei and the Kleine Konzert (Hermann Max): baroque choir and orchestra
 Sarband: baroque orchestra
 Sequentia (Benjamin Bagby): medieval
 La Stagione (Michael Schneider), Frankfurt: baroque orchestra
 Studio der frühen Musik (Thomas Binkley d.), Munich: medieval, disbanded
 Telemann-Kammerorchester Michaelstein (Ludger Rémy): baroque orchestra
 Weser-Renaissance Bremen (Manfred Cordes): Renaissance and baroque

Greece 
 Ex Silentio: medieval and baroque music

Iceland
 Voces Thules: Icelandic medieval music

Israel
 Jerusalem Baroque Orchestra: baroque orchestra (music director: David Shemer)
 Accademia Daniel: baroque chamber group
 Profeti della Quinta, Israel/Switzerland: vocal ensemble
 Barrocade: baroque orchestra (music director: Amit Tiefenbrunn)

Italy
 Academia Montis Regalis (Alessandro De Marchi): baroque orchestra
 Accademia Bizantina (Ottavio Dantone): baroque orchestra
 Accordone (Guido Morini): early baroque, often with Marco Beasley
 Auser Musici: baroque orchestra
 Cappella della Pietà de' Turchini (Antonio Florio): baroque orchestra
 Il Complesso Barocco (Alan Curtis): baroque orchestra
 Concerto Italiano (Rinaldo Alessandrini): madrigals and baroque orchestra
 Delitiæ Musicæ: Renaissance and baroque vocal music
 Ensemble Aurora (Enrico Gatti): baroque to classical
 Ensemble Micrologus: medieval
 Europa Galante (Fabio Biondi): baroque orchestra
 I Febiarmonici (Alan Curtis): madrigals
 Il Giardino Armonico (Giovanni Antonini), Milan: baroque orchestra
 Modo Antiquo (Bettina Hoffmann and Federico Maria Sardelli): medieval music to baroque orchestra
 La Reverdie: medieval
 I Solisti Veneti (Claudio Scimone): baroque orchestra on modern instruments
 La Venexiana (Claudio Cavina): madrigals
 Venice Baroque Orchestra (Andrea Marcon)

Japan
 Bach Collegium Japan (Masaaki Suzuki), Kobe: Bach

Latvia
 Canto (Andris Gailis), Riga: Renaissance and baroque vocal and instrumental music
 Collegium Choro Musici Riga (Māris Kupčs): baroque choir
 Collegium Musicum Riga (Māris Kupčs): baroque orchestra
 Lirum, Riga: Renaissance vocal music ensemble
 Ludus (Māra Birziņa), Riga: late Renaissance to early baroque (chamber music)
 Schola Cantorum Riga (Guntars Prānis): gregorian and early medieval chants
 Trakula: medieval and Renaissance vocal and instrumental music

Netherlands
 Amsterdam Baroque Orchestra & Choir (Ton Koopman): baroque orchestra
 Camerata Trajectina, Utrecht: Renaissance and baroque Dutch music
 Collegium Musicum Den Haag
 Egidius Kwartet, Holland: Renaissance vocal music
 Netherlands Bach Society, Naarden: baroque ensemble
 New Dutch Academy (Simon Murphy), The Hague, 18th- and early 19th-century symphonic music
 Orchestra of the Eighteenth Century (Frans Brüggen): baroque orchestra

Norway

Poland
 Polish Baroque Orchestra (Krzysztof Czerwinski)

Portugal
 Concerto Atlântico (Pedro Caldeira Cabral): medieval to baroque
 Il Dolcimelo (Isabel Monteiro): Renaissance
 Orquestra Barroca Casa da Música (Laurence Cummings): baroque orchestra
 AVRES SERVA (Nuno Oliveira): early baroque to early classical
 CONCERTO IBÉRICO ORQUESTRA BARROCA (João Paulo Janeiro): baroque orchestra
 FLORES DE MVSICA (João Paulo Janeiro): instrumental and vocal ensemble, renaissance to classical

Russia
 Insula Magica, Novosibirsk
 The Pocket Symphony (Nazar Kozhukhar), Moscow, St.Petersburg
 Pro Anima, Leningrad: 1980s, now disbanded
 La Voce Strumentale (Dmitry Sinkovsky), Moscow: baroque ensemble
 Pratum Integrum (Pavel Serbin), Moscow: baroque and classical orchestra

Serbia
 Ensemble Renaissance, Belgrade: medieval and Renaissance
 Ensemble Musica Antiqua Consort, Belgrade (1977): Medieval and Renaissance, also Baroque (vocal-instrumental ensemble, founder and director: Vera Zlokovich)
 Ensemble Musica Antiqua Serbiana, Belgrade (1987): Medieval vocal music of the Orthodox spiritual tradition (ensemble founder and director: Vera Zlokovich)
 New Trinity Baroque (Predrag Gosta), Belgrade

South Korea
 Musica Glorifica (Jin Kim), Seoul

Spain
 A5 vocal ensemble: vocal quintet
 Al Ayre Español (Eduardo López Banzo): baroque orchestra
 Atrium Musicae de Madrid: dissolved
 Capella de Ministrers (Carles Magraner): medieval to baroque
 La Capella Reial de Catalunya (Jordi Savall)
L'Apothéose baroque ensemble (18th Century) 
 Capilla Peñaflorida: Renaissance choral
 Cinco Siglos
 La Colombina: vocal ensemble
 Le Concert des Nations (Jordi Savall): baroque orchestra
 Hespèrion XX/Hespèrion XXI (Jordi Savall): Renaissance orchestra
 Música Antigua (Eduardo Paniagua): medieval, cantigas
 Musica Ficta (Raúl Mallavibarrena): Renaissance choral

Sweden

Switzerland
 Camerata Bern (Antje Weithaas): chamber orchestra
 Contre le Temps: women's medieval vocal ensemble
 Ensemble Elyma (Gabriel Garrido): baroque orchestra
 Ferrara Ensemble (Crawford Young), Basel: medieval and Renaissance
 Gli Angeli Genève, Geneva: baroque ensemble
 La Fiamma: medieval and renaissance ensemble
 Les Passions de l’Âme – Orchester für Alte Musik Bern (Meret Lüthi): baroque orchestra
 Students of the Schola Cantorum Basiliensis (Rene Jacobs), based in Basel: medieval to baroque

United Kingdom
 Academy of Ancient Music (Christopher Hogwood founder, currently Richard Egarr): baroque orchestra
 Alamire (David Skinner): vocal consort
 Avison Ensemble: baroque orchestra
 Brandenburg Consort (Roy Goodman): baroque orchestra
 Brecon Baroque (Rachel Podger): baroque orchestra
The Brook Street Band, Handel specialists
 Cancionero, Kent
 Cantilena (Adrian Shepherd): baroque on modern instruments
 The Cardinall's Musick (Andrew Carwood): choir
 City Waites (inc. Lucie Skeaping): medieval to baroque English music and folk
 Collegium Musicum 90 (Simon Standage), English baroque orchestra
 The Consort of Musicke (Anthony Rooley): Renaissance vocal, madrigals
 Deller Consort (founded by Alfred Deller d.): Renaissance and baroque chamber
 Dufay Collective: William Lyons, artistic director, medieval and renaissance instrumental and vocal
Dunedin Consort Director John Butt. Based in Scotland. 
 Early Music Consort of London (David Munrow d.): medieval, defunct
 Early Opera Company: baroque opera
 English Baroque Soloists (John Eliot Gardiner): baroque and classical-era music
 The English Concert (Trevor Pinnock founder, then Andrew Manze, now Harry Bicket)
 Ex Cathedra (Jeffrey Skidmore): choir and baroque orchestra
 I Fagiolini: vocal consort, madrigals
 Florilegium, London: baroque
 Fretwork: viol consort
 Gabrieli Consort & Players (Paul McCreesh): baroque choir and orchestra
 Gothic Voices (Christopher Page): medieval and Renaissance music
 The Hanover Band: period instrument orchestra
 The Harp Consort (Andrew Lawrence-King): Renaissance consort
 The Hilliard Ensemble (formerly directed by Paul Hillier): medieval, Renaissance and contemporary music
 The King's Consort (Robert King): baroque orchestra; see also Retrospect Ensemble
 King's Singers: vocal sextet
 London Baroque (founded in 1978 by Ingrid Seifert and Charles Medlam): baroque chamber orchestra
 Magpie Lane, Oxfordshire: folk band
 Musica Reservata (John S. Beckett), London
 New London Consort (Philip Pickett): medieval to baroque orchestra
 Orchestra of the Age of Enlightenment: baroque orchestra
 Orchestre Révolutionnaire et Romantique (John Eliot Gardiner): classical and romantic orchestra
 Orlando Consort: vocal quartet
 Oxford Camerata (Jeremy Summerly): Renaissance choral
 Palladian Ensemble, British instrumental ensemble (co-founded by Rachel Podger)
 The Parley of Instruments (Roy Goodman): baroque orchestra
 Phantasm: viol consort
 Philip Jones Brass Ensemble (Philip Jones): brass quintet
 Polyphony (Stephen Layton): Renaissance, romantic and contemporary music
 Pro Cantione Antiqua: Renaissance choral
 Raglan Baroque Players (Nicholas Kraemer): baroque orchestra
 Red Priest: baroque orchestra, specializing in Vivaldi
 Retrospect Ensemble: baroque orchestra
 Rose Consort of Viols
 La Serenissima (Adrian Chandler):  baroque orchestra, Vivaldi
 The Sixteen (Harry Christophers): mostly a cappella music of the Renaissance, with baroque orchestra for Handel
 Solistes de Musique Ancienne: baroque orchestra and choir
 Sounds Baroque (Julian Perkins): period instrument ensemble
 Tallis Scholars (Peter Phillips): a cappella Renaissance music
 Taverner Consort and Players (Andrew Parrott): Renaissance choir and baroque orchestra
 Theatre of Voices: vocal consort
 Tonus Peregrinus (Antony Pitts): Renaissance and contemporary choir
 Trinity Baroque, Trinity College, Cambridge: vocal ensemble 
 Voces8: vocal ensemble
 Westminster Abbey Choir (Simon Preston)
 Westminster Cathedral Choir (David Hill)

United States
 Alkemie Early Music Ensemble
 American Bach Soloists
 Anonymous 4: all-female a cappella ensemble specializing in medieval music
 Apollo's Fire (Jeannette Sorrell), Cleveland: Renaissance, baroque, early classical orchestra
 Arcadia Players
 Asteria Medievale, duo, New York: Renaissance chansons
 Bach Ensemble (Joshua Rifkin): baroque soloists and orchestra
 Bach Sinfonia (Daniel Abraham), Maryland
 Baltimore Consort
 Blue Heron, Boston
 Boston Baroque (Martin Pearlman): baroque orchestra
 Boston Camerata (Anne Azéma)
 Boston Early Music Festival: baroque orchestra and opera company
 Bourbon Baroque (Nicolas Fortin and John Austin Clark): baroque orchestra
 Camerata Mediterranea (Joel Cohen)
 Chanticleer: choir
 Early Music New York, medieval, Renaissance, baroque and classical
 Ensemble Alcatraz (Shira Kammen): medieval
Fanfare Barok, baroque, Washington, D.C.
 Folger Consort
 Handel and Haydn Society, Boston: baroque choir and orchestra
Indianapolis Baroque Orchestra (Barthold Kuijken)
 Lyra Baroque Orchestra (Jacques Ogg): baroque to early classical orchestra 
 Magnificat Baroque Ensemble
 Music of the Baroque (Jane Glover), Chicago
 Musica Angelica (Martin Haselböck), Los Angeles
 New Trinity Baroque (Predrag Gosta), Atlanta
 New York Collegium (Andrew Parrott), dissolved
 New York Pro Musica Antiqua (Noah Greenberg d. 1966, then John Reeves White to 1974): choir, defunct
 Newberry Consort, at the Newberry Library: baroque chamber
North Carolina Baroque Orchestra, Davidson, NC
 Opera Lafayette: pre-1800 opera
 Philharmonia Baroque Orchestra (Nicholas McGegan): baroque orchestra
 Piffaro, The Renaissance Band, Philadelphia
 Portland Baroque Orchestra (Monica Huggett)
 Project Ars Nova (inc. Crawford Young): medieval
 Renaissance Street Singers, New York City, a cappella Renaissance
 Rose Ensemble Jordan Sramek, St. Paul
 Schola Antiqua of Chicago
 Texas Early Music Project, Austin, Texas
 Tempesta di Mare: The Philadelphia Baroque Orchestra (Gwyn Roberts)
 TENET (ensemble), now known as TENET Vocal Artists, New York, NY
 Three Notch'd Road: The Virginia Baroque Ensemble, Charlottesville, VA
 Virginia Tech Early Music Ensemble
 Voices of Music, San Francisco, California
 Wyoming Baroque, Sheridan, Wyoming

Unspecified or international
 Cappella Mediterranea (Leonardo García-Alarcón)
 Ensemble Syntagma (Alexandre Danilevsky)
 European Community Baroque Orchestra (Roy Goodman), European Union
 Tetraktys (Kees Boeke), medieval, early Renaissance

References

 Early music ensembles
Early music ensembles
Early music ensembles